Kothaguda is a big agency Mandal in Mulugu Constituency of Mahabubabad district of Telangana in India.

Geography 
Kothaguda is located at 18° 55'0N 75° 54' 0E. It has an average altitude of 225 meters. Kothaguda is a historical place. Before Independence, the administrative unit of Narsampet was officially known as Pakhal Taluka because of its proximity to the area's lifeline - the Pakhal lake, largest lake in the region built by the Kakatiya rulers. Over the years the village has grown into a small town inhabited by around 30,000 people.

The growth of Kothaguda has steadily absorbed neighbouring hamlets such as Mylaram and Gandhinagar. The town's growth has received a big boost around ten years ago in the form of a large public investment to develop it as a model town which resulted in improvements in infrastructure, particularly roads, drains and water supply. Life in the town has become more livable following the inclusion of fresh Pakhal water to the entire village. The village has grown primarily due to the migration into the town from nearby villages. The businesses in the town are dominated by these migrants who prospered as they moved into the town. The villages comes under this mandal are Kothapally, Mylaram, Gunjedu, Burgu Gumpu, Polaram, krishtapuram, and rautupally.

The nearby village Gunjedu at 3 km towards Mahaboobad. It is a new attraction of Gunjedu Musalamma Jatara like Medaram famous for Tribes and surrounding people, due to its serene nature of the village and surrounded by pond and its decent infrastructure and its people who are now famous for their good education.

The town has recently experienced a decrease in economic purchasing power as a local drought has ravaged the harvests of most farmers in the surrounding fields and villages. This occurred throughout the summer of 2009.

Agriculture 

Most of the agriculture cultivation is done through the Kothaguda Lake and Pakhal Lake in this area. and major crop in this area are Paddy, Cotton, Maize, Grams and some seasonal crops.  Due to the rich in fertile lands the people will have around 2 crops for year based on the rainfall.

A man-made lake was built in 1213 by the Kakatiya king, Ganapathideva, by harnessing a small tributary of the Krishna River.  It is located 50 km from Warangal and spreads over an area of 30 km.

Education 

Kothaguda has Two Ashram High Schools, Residential, Social Welfare School and 3 famous Private Education schools .
 AP Tribal Welfare Residential School (for Girls)
 Ashrama T.W.High School (Boys and Girls)
 APSW School & Hostel (Boys)
 Sun Rise Shishu Mandir, Gandhinagar
 Alluri e-techno School(EM), Ganghinagar
 Prathaprudra Degree college(TM)co-Education, Ganghinagar
 mpps kothaguda 
 Govt junior college kothaguda
 vivekananda junior college
 Ambedhkar Educational Institutions

Pachayats of Kothaguda 
 Kothaguda
 Komatlagudem
 Marrigudem
 SadireddyPally
 Punugondla
 Madagudem
 Gangaram
 Musmi
 Edullapally
 Karlai
 Otaai
 Pogullapally
 Velubelly
 Bathulapally
 Jangavanigudem
 Gundampally
Thati vari vempally

References 

Mandals in Mahabubabad district
Villages in Mahabubabad district